Craxi ( or) is an Italian surname which originated from Sicily. Notable people with the surname include:

Bettino Craxi (1934–2000), Italian politician
Bobo Craxi (born 1964), Italian politician, son of Bettino
Stefania Craxi (born 1960), Italian politician, daughter of Bettino

References

Italian-language surnames